Magnolia biondii, or Biondi's magnolia, is a deciduous tree that flowers in late winter to early spring before leaf growth. Its early flowering nature gives it the name of the Hope for Spring Flower.

Magnolia biondiiis a member of the family Magnoliaceae, which consists of more than 210 species. It is widely found in Northern China. It produces small white flowers every few years. Leave buds and petals of the plant are used to alleviate nasal obstruction and coughing in some parts of China.

Distribution
Magnolia biondii is widely distributed in China. It is commonly found in Gansu, Henan, Hubei, Shaanxi, Sichuan provinces. It is usually found in forests in the mountains.

Habitat and ecology
Magnolia biondii is a deciduous tree that grows mainly in temperate forests in the mountains. It has a broadly conical to spreading habit.

Morphology of leaf
Its bark has a pale grey, smooth appearance. It produces simple leaf type with ovate shape. Furthermore, leaves are arranged in an alternative pattern. Leaves have pinnate venation. Moreover, stamens and carpels are spirally arranged.

Flowers and fruit
Flowers of Magnolia biondii are small and white and have strong fragrance associated to them. Flowers parts are in sets of threes. In general, flowers have six petals and three sepals. More specifically, the petals are pink at the base and white at the top. Furthermore, flowers have cone-shaped receptacle that bears spirally arranged carpels from which styles emerge.

Stamens are cream-white in color. In addition, flowers take several years to appear. Because of the small size and long growth period, Magnolia biondii is seldom used for ornamental purposes. 
Magnolia biondii produce aggregate fruits that consist of numerous separate carpels of one gynoecium. The fruits form in cylindrical cluster and protrude on a stalk. Individual fruitlets are red at first, then turn brown upon maturity.

Usage

Food
Dried flower buds and petals of Magnolia biondii are considered food in some parts of China.  Fresh flower buds can be prepared by mixing with vinegar and ginger. Petals can be fried with flour batter coating.

Medicinal
The dried flower buds of Magnolia biondii are used medicinally in China and Japan. They are used to relieve coughing and nasal obstruction. Pharmacologically, five lignans including pinoresinol dimethyl ether, magnolin, epi-magnolin A, fargesin, and demethoxyaschantin have been attributed to the medicinal effect of Magnolia biondii.

Similar species
Magnolia biondii is closely related to the Japanese Willow-Leaf Magnolia, Magnolia salicifolia, which has aromatic foliage and shoots. Resemblance is also observed in Magnolia dendata. Magnolia biondii is generally distinguished by its smaller size, narrower leaves, and smaller flowers.

References

biondii